The River Line is a 1964 West German war drama film directed by Rudolf Jugert and starring Peter van Eyck, Marie Versini and Walter Rilla.

Cast

References

Bibliography

External links 
 

1964 films
West German films
German war drama films
1960s war drama films
German World War II films
Films about the French Resistance
1960s German-language films
Films directed by Rudolf Jugert
Films based on British novels
1964 drama films
1960s German films